Flavio Cipolla (born 20 October 1983) is an Italian tennis coach and former player. His career-high Association of Tennis Professionals (ATP) ranking was No. 70, achieved on 23 April 2012. He reached the second round of the 2007 French Open, where he lost to Rafael Nadal. His best major result was reaching the third round of the 2008 US Open.

Career

2008
Cipolla began 2008 with a bang the first week in January, winning the singles and doubles
titles of the Challenger in New Caledonia, to get his singles ranking to a career high of #116.
He won 2 more Challenger doubles titles in February in Belgrade and in March in Italy
to establish himself as a top-100 doubles player.

Cipolla got a chance to compete in a grand-slam tournament at the 2008 U.S. Open in the men's singles competition at Flushing Meadows. Despite losing in qualifying he, along with Rui Machado, were reinstated following the withdrawals of Mikhail Youzhny. Cipolla made the most of his opportunity and reached the third round. In the first round he beat Jan Hernych before defeating Yen-Hsun Lu of Chinese Taipei in the second round. In the third round he came up against world number 10 and tenth seed Stanislas Wawrinka of Switzerland. Cipolla took the match to 5 sets by taking a shock two set lead, however his Swiss opponent still had enough to come from behind and take the match, emerging victorious 5–7, 6–7, 6–4, 6–0, 6–4.

Coaching

In February 2023, Cipolla began coaching top 10 Women's Tennis Association (WTA) player Daria Kasatkina, replacing her longtime coach Carlos Martinez.

ATP career finals

Doubles: 1 (1 title)

Challenger career finals

Singles (5)

Doubles (17)

Runners-up (22)

Singles (8)

Doubles (15)

Performance timelines

Singles

Doubles
''Current till 2013 Australian Open.

References

External links

 
 
 
 Cipolla world ranking history

1983 births
Living people
Italian male tennis players
Tennis players from Rome